The copulative a (also a copulativum, a athroistikon)  is the prefix ha- or a- expressing unity in Ancient Greek, derived from Proto-Indo-European *sm̥-, cognate to English same (see also Symbel).

An example is a-delphos "brother", from *sm̥-gwelbhos literally "from the same womb" (compare Delphi).

In Proto-Greek, s at the beginning of a word became h by debuccalization and syllabic m̥ became a, giving ha-. The initial h was sometimes lost by psilosis or Grassmann's law.

Cognate forms in other languages preserve the s: for example, the Sanskrit prefix saṃ- in the name of the language, saṃ-s-kṛtā "put together". Less exact cognates include English same and some, and Latin simul "at the same time" and similis "similar".

Other words in Greek are related, including háma "at the same time", homós "same", and heís "one" (from ).

See also
 Privative a

References

Indo-European linguistics
Greek language